Zale rufosa is a moth of the family Noctuidae. It is found on Jamaica.

References

Moths described in 1913
Catocalinae